The Data Security Threats Database (BDU) is the Russian Federation's national vulnerability database. It is maintained by the Russian Federal Service for Technical and Export Control. As of 2018, the BDU contained only roughly one-tenth of the number of entries of the corresponding U.S. National Vulnerability Database.

References 

Security vulnerability databases